Luphephe River is a tributary of the Nwanedi River in Limpopo Province, South Africa.

Its origin is in the Dzumbama/Tshitandani/Tshamulungwi area about 10 km from where Nwanedi River springs on the other side of the mountain. It flows to the north towards the Luphephe Dam. Just before it enters Nwanedi Nature Reserve, it joins the Savhani River supplying Luphephe/Nwanedi Dam where it joins Nwanedi River at the Nwanedi Dam. The Savhani River starts in Gwangwatini, passing Ngalavhani, Tshitanzhe, Musunda, Gumela, Tshikotoni Helula, and Manzhenge villages.

Rivers of Limpopo